Mynämäki is a municipality of Finland located in the Southwest Finland region. Neighbouring municipalities are Aura, Eura, Laitila, Masku, Nousiainen, Pöytyä, Rusko, Taivassalo, Turku and Vehmaa.

The municipality is unilingually Finnish.

The municipality of Karjala was consolidated with Mynämäki in 1977. The municipality of Mietoinen was consolidated with Mynämäki in 2007.

Notable people
 Count Augustin Ehrensvärd (1710–1772) - Field Marshal and the military architect of the Suomenlinna fortress
 Daniel Juslenius (1676–1752)
 Antti Lizelius (1708–1795) - Vicar of Mynämäki in 1761 - 1795, was the publisher of the first Finnish language newspaper - Suomenkieliset Tietosanomat 
 Pekka Aakula (1866–1928)
 Toivo Sukari (born 1954)

References

External links
 
 Municipality of Mynämäki – Official website 

 
Populated coastal places in Finland